Decimus et Ultimus Barziza (also known as D.U. Barziza, Decimus Barziza, and Des Barziza ) (September 4, 1838 in Williamsburg, Virginia – January 30, 1882 in Houston, Texas) was an American businessman, lawyer, and politician, who served two terms in the Texas Legislature.

Early life 
Barziza was born in Virginia in 1838. His father, Phillip Ignatius Barziza (originally Filippo Ignazio Barziza), was a viscount who had emigrated from Venice in 1820 and been forced to cede his title of nobility and become an American citizen in order to legally qualify for a bequest; he subsequently married a French-Canadian woman, with whom he had ten children.
The Barzizas named their tenth child "Decimus et Ultimus", Latin for "tenth and last".

Barziza attended the College of William and Mary in his hometown of Williamsburg from 1854-1857. He then moved to Texas and later in 1857 enrolled in the law school at Baylor University. He graduated in 1859 and established his law practice in Owensville.

In 1861, the American Civil War began, and Barziza enlisted in the Confederate Army (4th Texas Infantry), where he served under Louis Wigfall and John Bell Hood. He was twice injured in combat, and fought in the Battle of Gettysburg, where he was captured at Little Round Top.

After spending a year in hospital as a prisoner of war, he escaped by leaping out the window of a moving prisoner-transport train in the middle of the night, and walking to Upper Canada, where Confederate sympathizers relayed him to Nova Scotia, and then Bermuda; there, a blockade runner returned him to North Carolina. From North Carolina, he was able to return to Texas, where he wrote his memoirs of captivity and of life as a fugitive, titled The Adventures of a Prisoner of War, and Life and Scenes in Federal Prisons: Johnson's Island, Fort Delaware, and Point Lookout, by an Escaped Prisoner of Hood's Texas Brigade.

Political career 
Barziza represented Harris County during the Fourteenth Texas Legislature (1874–1875) and the first session of the Fifteenth Texas Legislature (1876).

During the fourteenth legislature, he played a key role in the controversial transition of the Governorship from Edmund J. Davis to Richard Coke.

During the fifteenth legislature he ran for Speaker of the House but lost by two votes. At the end of the session, Barziza became embroiled in a procedural dispute regarding the Texas and Pacific Railway: in an effort to prevent a vote, he and 33 other representatives did not return from recess on July 31, 1876, so that there would not be a quorum. In response, the speaker ordered that the absentee representatives be arrested and forcibly brought back to the legislature. On August 2, 1876, Barziza resigned.

Legacy 
Barziza Street, in the Houston neighborhood of Eastwood, is named for him.

In 1964, the University of Texas Press re-published his memoirs.

References

External links 

1838 births
1882 deaths
Baylor Law School alumni
College of William & Mary alumni
Democratic Party members of the Texas House of Representatives
American people of Italian descent
Politicians from Williamsburg, Virginia
American people of French-Canadian descent
People of Texas in the American Civil War
Confederate States Army soldiers
People from Robertson County, Texas
19th-century American memoirists
American Civil War prisoners of war
19th-century American politicians
People of Venetian descent